I Want Candy is a 2007 British sex comedy film directed by Stephen Surjik.

Plot
A group of film students at Leatherhead University in search of funding for their feature film The Love Storm end up having to rewrite and make it into a pornographic film. This leads the boys head first into a world of erotica that they did not even know existed and into the life of actress Candy Fiveways (Carmen Electra).

Cast
 Tom Riley as Joe
 Tom Burke as Baggy
 Carmen Electra as Candy Fiveways
 Eddie Marsan as Doug
 Michelle Ryan as Lila
 Mackenzie Crook as Dulberg
 Felicity Montagu as Mum
 Philip Jackson as Dad
 Jimmy Carr as Video Store Guy
 John Standing as Michael de Vere

Production

Background 
It was shot on a low budget in West London in June and July 2006 and was picked up by Buena Vista International for wide national release.

"I Want Candy" is also the title of a song written and originally recorded by The Strangeloves in 1965, and covered by Melanie C for the film.

Locations
Scenes in the fictional Leatherhead University were filmed on the campus of Brooklands College in Weybridge, Surrey.

Reception

Critical response
On Rotten Tomatoes the film has an approval rating of 56% based on reviews from 9 critics.

Channel 4, gave it a positive review. Empire Magazine called it "A warm-hearted, smutty comedy that, if predictable, has a likeable cast and plenty of zip.".
Time Out wrote: "despite the usual failings of a cash-strapped British film – unconvincing subplots, continuity errors, ropey bit-part actors – this cheerful exploitation of ‘The Full Monty’ formula still entertains."

Box office 
The film entered the UK top 10 at number seven, and moved to No.11 the following week.

Home media
I Want Candy was released on DVD on 20 August 2007. It was rated 15. The special features included on the DVD were deleted scenes, bloopers, and 'The Making Of...'. It also included scenes which were from the official website like "Joe and Baggy's 10 tips to making a film" and "What's your porn star name?."

References

External links

 
 
 Sky Movies including video diary

2007 films
2007 comedy films
2000s sex comedy films
2000s teen comedy films
British sex comedy films
British teen comedy films
Ealing Studios films
2000s English-language films
Films about pornography
Films directed by Stephen Surjik
Films set in universities and colleges
Films shot in London
Films shot in Surrey
Films with screenplays by Fred Wolf
Teen sex comedy films
2000s British films